Northwest Airlink Flight 5719  was a flight from Minneapolis-Saint Paul International Airport to International Falls Airport in International Falls, Minnesota with a scheduled intermediate stop at Chisholm-Hibbing Airport in Hibbing, Minnesota. On December 1, 1993, the Jetstream 31, operated by Express Airlines I as Northwest Airlink, collided with a group of trees in a forest during final approach to Hibbing, and crashed into two ridges northwest of the airport, killing all sixteen passengers and the two pilots on board.

Passengers and crew

There were 16 passengers on board the Jetstream 31, a twin-engine turboprop manufactured by British Aerospace, for a flight from Minneapolis-Saint Paul International Airport, in Hennepin County, Minnesota, with a stop at Chisholm-Hibbing Airport, in Hibbing. There were two pilots operating the aircraft: the captain was Marvin Falitz (42); the first officer was Chad Erickson (25). At the time of this flight, Erickson had 65 hours experience flying this type of aircraft. Captain Falitz was flying the aircraft at the time of the crash. He had failed proficiency checks previously in 1988, 1992, and earlier in 1993, but passed the most recent test in November 1993.

Flight

Flight 5719 took off over 40 minutes late from Minneapolis-St. Paul. This was due to a late arrival and the replacement of landing light bulbs in Minneapolis-St. Paul. The aircraft was further delayed when it was deemed overweight for departure, requiring the removal of one passenger from the aircraft.

Crash
Until moments before the crash, Flight 5719 was uneventful and no emergency was declared. The plane was cleared for a landing on runway 31 at Hibbing, but the flight crew requested an approach to runway 13 instead, because there was a tailwind on the approach to runway 31, which was also covered with precipitation. The flight crew initiated the approach procedure by joining the Hibbing distance measuring equipment (DME) arc from the Hibbing VHF omnidirectional range (VOR) radio navigation system, and intercepting the instrument landing system localizer at  MSL. That delayed the start of the plane's descent, which meant that an excessive rate of descent was required. The Jetstream 31 was not equipped with a ground proximity warning system that had already been made mandatory for larger aircraft.

The aircraft continued its descent through the  step-down altitude. Finally, the plane collided with two ridges and came to rest inverted and lying on its right side.

Investigation

At first, icing was considered as a possible cause of the crash. This was later ruled out as a factor by the National Transportation Safety Board (NTSB). The cause of the crash was the loss of altitude awareness; this led to a failure to maintain minimum descent altitude for the approach, resulting in an impact with trees and a ridge before the aircraft reached the runway.

Falitz was said to have a reputation for following company procedures and being meticulous with flight check lists, but three first officers accused him of being deliberately rough on the flight controls. A chief pilot described Falitz as competent, but prone to outbursts of angereven taking out his anger on an operational plane doing dangerous maneuvers in-flightand intimidating and provocative behavior with colleagues. Falitz was accused of once slapping a co-pilot's headphones in anger. His previous intimidation of first officers was noted by the investigators.

The concluding statement from the NTSB report (NTSB/AAR-94/05) provided the following probable cause for the crash of Northwest Airlink Flight 5719: "The captain's actions led to a breakdown in crew coordination and the loss of altitude awareness by the flight crew during an unstabilized approach in night instrument meteorological conditions. Contributing to the accident were: the failure of the company management to adequately address the previously identified deficiencies in airmanship and crew resource management of the captain; the failure of the company to identify and correct a widespread, unapproved practice during instrument approach procedures; and the Federal Aviation Administration's inadequate surveillance and oversight of the air carrier."

In popular culture
The crash of Northwest Airlink Flight 5719 was covered in "Killer Attitude", a Season 16 (2017) episode of the internationally syndicated Canadian TV documentary series Mayday, also known as Air Disasters and other titles.

See also
Widerøe Flight 710
Avianca Flight 410
Alitalia Flight 404, another CFIT accident where the crew used poor crew resource management.
British European Airways Flight 548 and Kenya Airways Flight 507, other cases where the bully-like attitude of captains led to a breakdown in crew communication.
Armavia Flight 967, a case where a captain flew his aircraft onto water after cursing at an air traffic controller.

References

External links

1993 in Minnesota
Airliner accidents and incidents in Minnesota
Airliner accidents and incidents involving controlled flight into terrain
Airliner accidents and incidents caused by pilot error
Northwest Airlink accidents and incidents
Accidents and incidents involving the British Aerospace Jetstream
Disasters in Minnesota
Aviation accidents and incidents in the United States in 1993
December 1993 events in the United States